Martin Zeileis (born 21 September 1964 in Vienna) is a sailor from Austria, together with Karl Haist (helmsman) and Patrick Wichmann (foredeck), Zeileis won second place during the 2012 European Soling Championship. With this team he became the Best Europeans in this series.

Sailing career
Martin Zeileis has a impressive career as Soling crew since the mid 80's of the 20th century. He holds several national Soling titles in Austria, Germanyand United States and celebrated many victories in European regatta's like the Omega Cup (GER), Erich Hirt Pokal (GER), Alpen Cup, Paris Soling Trophy (FRA), Trofeo Dino Schiesaro (ITA) and Campionato Autonomico Madrid (ESP). Besides that he competed successfully in Soling Championships in the Canada, Brazil and the USA.

World Ranking Lists
 In 2019, 2020 and 2021 Zeileis won the Soling World Trophy. This trophy is granted to the leader in the annual ranking list of the International Soling Association on the 31st of December

Professional career
Zeileis works at Gallspach, Austria as Doctor of Medicine. practicing rehabilitation at the healthcare clinic "Institut Zeileis"

References

External links
 

1964 births
Living people
Austrian male sailors (sport)
Sportspeople from Vienna
Soling class sailors